Poke  (Hawaiian for "to slice" or "cut crosswise into pieces"; sometimes anglicised as 'poké' to aid pronunciation) is diced raw fish served either as an appetizer or a main course and is a popular dish in Hawaii. Traditional forms are aku (skipjack tuna) and hee (octopus). Hee poke is sometimes called  tako poke in places where the Hawaiian language is not spoken. Poke differs from other raw fish dishes in that it does not use citrus fruits as a curing agent.

History
Poke began with fishermen seasoning the cut-offs from their catch to serve as a snack. According to the food historian Rachel Laudan, the present form of poke became popular around the 1970s. It used skinned, deboned, and filleted raw fish served with Hawaiian salt, seaweed, and roasted, ground candlenut meat. This form of poke is still common in the Hawaiian islands.

Beginning around 2012, poke became increasingly popular in North America. From 2014 to mid-2016, "the number of Hawaiian restaurants on Foursquare, which includes those that serve poke," doubled, going from 342 to 700. These restaurants serve both traditional and modern versions of the dish. The modern version is sometimes called poké bowl and may have the ingredients arranged in a grouped way rather than mixed. Contemporary poke restaurants are mostly—but not exclusively—fast casual style restaurants where the dish is fully customizable from the base to the marinade on the fish. 

There is a three-day "I Love Poke" festival held in San Diego yearly to celebrate the dish and its many variations.

Controversy
Poke has existed in Hawaii since the early 1970s, but in the mid to late 2010s, it skyrocketed in popularity in the continental United States. This has allowed for lots of cultural controversy. In October of 2015, a restaurant in New York named Sons of Thunder turned to serving poke as a backup plan after dealing with stove issues. Since Sons of Thunder's poke boom in 2015, cities like Los Angeles and New York have seen numerous other poke shops open, as well as international destinations like Toronto, London, and Sydney. Various Hawaiian locals shared their thoughts about poke in the mainland: "I tried one, and I swore never to go again," said Sonny Acosta, 30, who moved to New York from Honolulu two years ago. "It's not really poke. It's not just that poke tastes better when you're in Hawaii. It's that mainland restaurateurs, bandwagoning on what they see as the biggest trend of the year,  changed it into something altogether different - something that people from Hawaii say doesn't respect their cultural heritage". In an attempt to make an unfamiliar word easier for customers to pronounce, some restaurants changed their spelling of the word to "poki". The spelling, for some Hawaiians, crosses the line of what is and what isn't cultural appropriation. "It's sort of the continuation of the colonization of our people, where they tell us how we should act, and how we should spell and how we should eat our food," said Noelani Puniwai, an assistant professor of Hawaiian studies at the University of Hawaii, Manoa. 

In 2018, large backlash arose when a poke shop in Chicago placed a trademark on its name, “Aloha Poke,” and sent threatening messages to other shops around the country who shared parts of the name, telling them to change it immediately. State senator Jarrett Keohokalole shared his frustration at the audacity of non-members of the Hawaiian community using legal mechanisms and asking natives to using words and symbols significant to Hawaiian culture. Native Hawaiian experts mention the clash in cultural tendencies as a reason for this incident: European tendencies are centered around patents and copyrights that both incentivize and privatize knowledge and ideas, whereas indigenous cultures such as native Hawaiians tend to collectively share knowledge and pass it down through successive generations. In response to such an incident, native Hawaiian organizations and other state agencies pushed to develop a task force that would propose a legal system that would protect the intellectual property and cultural practices of the native Hawaiians. Kuhio Lewis, the CEO of the Council for Native Hawaiian Advancement (CNHA), supports the task force but is aware of the difficulties with where to draw the lines on who can make such decisions, and who will be allowed to be able to used Native Hawaiian culture, without violating the First Amendment. “At the least, they need to have some cultural sensitivity about how it’s used. They need to know you can’t be telling Native Hawaiian businesses they can’t use their own language”.

Ingredients
The traditional Hawaiian poke consists of fish that has been gutted, skinned, and deboned. 
Traditional Hawaiian poke may consist of cubed raw fish, maui onions, inamona (roasted, crushed and salted candlenut), green onions, and/or sesame oil.  It is served with traditional condiments such as Hawaiian sea salt and limu. 

Modern Hawaiian versions of traditional poke seasonings have been heavily influenced by Japanese and other Asian cuisines, such as soy sauce, furikake (mix of dried fish, sesame seeds, and dried seaweed), chopped dried or fresh chili pepper, fish eggs, and wasabi. Fish types may include cured hee (octopus), other types of raw tuna, raw salmon and various kinds of shellfish.

North American variations may include ponzu sauce, teriyaki sauce, soy sauce,  sriracha sauce, and mayonnaise as sauces, and avocado, mushrooms, crispy onions, pickled jalapeño, cilantro, pineapple, cucumber, edamame, green onions, and a variety of other fusion cuisine vegetables among the chopped ingredients. Unlike traditional Hawaiian poke, the mainland style is typically not pre-marinated but is instead prepared with sauces on demand. A variety of fish may be available, with ahi tuna the most popular, and yellowtail, salmon, octopus, crab, and imitation crab as common additional choices.  An option to add a base of cooked rice is not uncommon.

Similar dishes
Poke is similar to other Polynesian fish salads such as ika mata in the Cook Islands, kokoda in Fiji, oka in Samoa and ota ika in Tonga.

A very similar dish is the kinilaw of the Philippines. Kinilaw is usually raw diced fish marinated in citrus juice, sour fruits, or vinegar with extracts from mangrove bark or fruits (and sometimes coconut milk). This process can also be applied to other seafood and lightly blanched or grilled meat (the latter being generally differentiated as kilawin). The dish was introduced to Guam during the Spanish colonial period, resulting in the derivative Chamorro dish of kelaguen.

The Ilocano dish poqui poqui of the Philippines also likely derived its name from poke, after the influx of Ilocano sugarcane workers to Hawaii during the American colonization of the Philippines. However, they are very different dishes, with poqui poqui being a scrambled egg dish with grilled eggplants and tomatoes.

Raw fish dishes similar to poke that are often served in Europe are fish carpaccio and fish tartare. Also similar to poke are Korean hoe-deopbap, marinated raw tuna served over rice, and Peruvian ceviche. Japanese sashimi also consists of raw seafood; other similar Japanese dishes are zuke don, a donburi dish topped with cured fish (usually tuna or salmon) along with avocado topped with furikake, and kaisendon, a more elaborate version served with additional non-fish toppings.

See also

 Buddha bowl
 Crudo
 Hoe 
 Kinilaw
 List of hors d'oeuvre
 List of raw fish dishes
 List of salads
 'Ota 'ika
 Sam Choy
 Singju
 Tataki
 Yusheng
 Cuisine of Hawaii

References

External links

 History of the poke contest

Hawaiian cuisine
Appetizers
Raw fish salads
National dishes
Uncooked fish dishes
Seafood dishes